DZXL (558 AM) Radyo Trabaho is a radio station owned and operated by the Radio Mindanao Network. The station's studio is located on the 4th Floor, Guadalupe Commercial Complex, EDSA corner P. Burgos St., Brgy. Guadalupe Nuevo, Makati, while its transmitter is located along Bagumbayan St., Brgy. Taliptip, Bulakan, Bulacan (sharing facilities with Veritas 846).

Notable anchors

Former
 Aljo Bendijo
 Ces Drilon
 Vice Pres. Leni Robredo

References

DZXL
Radio stations established in 1963
News and talk radio stations in the Philippines
Radio Mindanao Network stations